The GLAAD Media Award is an accolade bestowed by GLAAD to recognize and honor various branches of the media for their outstanding representations of the lesbian, gay, bisexual and transgender (LGBT) community and the issues that affect their lives.  In addition to film and television, the Awards also recognize achievements in other branches of the media and arts, including theatre, music, journalism and advertising.

Honorees are selected by a process involving over 700 GLAAD Media Award voters and volunteers and are evaluated using four criteria: "Fair, Accurate and Inclusive Representations" of the LGBT community, "Boldness and Originality" of the project, significant "Cultural Impact" on mainstream culture, and "Overall Quality" of the project.  Results are then certified by a "Review Panel" who determine the final list of recipients based on voting results and their own "expert opinions".

The 1st GLAAD Media Awards ceremony honoring the 1989 season was held in 1990, and recognized 34 nominees in 7 competitive categories.

History
The first GLAAD Media Awards were presented by the Gay & Lesbian Alliance Against Defamation in 1990 to honor the 1989 season, and were envisioned as a way to recognize various branches of the media for their fair, accurate and inclusive representations of the lesbian, gay, bisexual and transgender community and the issues that affect their lives.

The 1st Annual Awards ceremony recognized 34 nominees in 7 competitive categories and was a relatively "small" affair.  At the 20th Annual Awards ceremony presented in 2009, GLAAD Award Honoree, Phil Donahue said of the first Annual ceremony: “It’s unbelievable to think about the power and the warp speed of this revolution. Twenty years ago when I proudly accepted the first GLAAD Media Award…it was a very small crowd. There are more photographers here tonight than there were people then".

For the first six years, winners were announced prior to the ceremony.  Beginning with the 7th Annual Awards held in 1996, the change was made to its current format, announcing the winners in competitive categories at the ceremony. The 15th Annual Awards held in 2004 marked the first year nominations were expanded to recognize media in Spanish-language categories. The 16th Annual Awards held in 2005 marked the first year that the ceremonies were televised, first airing on the LGBT-themed Logo channel on July 24, 2005.

Statuette
The original GLAAD Media Award stood approximately 6-inches (15 cm) tall, consisting of a flat, 5-inch (13 cm) square-shaped crystal sculpture with a design of five concentric circles on a "newsprint" background. The sculpture was traditionally etched with the year it was presented followed by the words "GLAAD Media Award" and was mounted perpendicular to its flat, quadrant shaped base.

The award remained unchanged until 2009, when an all new statuette designed by David Moritz of Society Awards was unveiled for the 20th annual GLAAD Media Awards ceremonies. The current statuette stands 12-inches (30.5 cm) tall, consisting of a 9-inch (23 cm) die-cast zinc sculpture, hand finished with a satin texture, plated with a nickel and rhodium finish, and mounted on a 3-inch (7.6 cm) tall, black-stained ash, trapezoidal shaped base.

Nomination
Nominees are selected by GLAAD "Nominating Juries" consisting of over 90 volunteers with interest and expertise in the particular category they are judging. Nominating Juries may select up to five nominees in each category.  If no projects are deemed worthy of nomination in a particular category, the jury may choose to not award that category. At the end of the year, the Nominating Juries submit their list of recommended nominees to GLAAD's staff and Board of Directors for approval.

In addition to media monitoring by the juries, GLAAD issues a "Call for Entries", inviting media outlets to submit their work for consideration, however, GLAAD may nominate a mainstream media project even if it is not submitted as part of the call for entries. GLAAD does not monitor media created by and for the LGBT community for defamation, therefore, media outlets created by and for an LGBT audience must submit in order to be considered for nomination.

Candidates considered for nomination are evaluated using four criteria: "Fair, Accurate and Inclusive Representations", meaning that the diversity of the LGBT community is represented, "Boldness and Originality", meaning the project breaks new ground by exploring LGBT subject matter in non-traditional ways, "Cultural Impact", meaning the project impacts an audience that may not regularly be exposed to LGBT issues, and "Overall Quality", meaning a project of extremely high quality which adds impact and significance to the images and issues portrayed.

Selection
Over 600 GLAAD Media Award voters participate in the selection of Honorees from the pool of Nominees in each category via online balloting.  Voters are made up of three groups: GLAAD staff and board, GLAAD Alliance and Media Circle members, and GLAAD volunteers & allies (which include former Honorees, media industry allies, volunteers from the "Nominating Juries" and "Event Production Teams").

These results are then reviewed for certification by a "Review Panel" which consists of the GLAAD Board co-chairs, senior GLAAD program and communications staff, and media industry experts.  Members of the Review Panel are expected to view all of the nominees in each category, and the final list of award recipients is determined by the Review Panel based on the results of the online balloting and their own "expert opinions".

Categories
The first Annual Awards recognized Honorees in just 7 competitive categories, all for television.  Over the years, the competitive categories have been expanded to recognize various other branches of the media including, film, theatre, music, print media, digital media, and advertising, as well as establishing additional categories recognizing Spanish-language media and a "Special Recognition" category for media representations that may not meet the criteria of pre-existing categories.

While many of the categories have been expanded over time, several early categories have been "merged" or phased out altogether. One notable example being the omission of the "Outstanding Daytime Drama" category in 2011, reflecting the steady decline in popularity of English-language daytime soaps. As of 2018, GLAAD considers nominations in a total of 27 English-language categories and 12 Spanish-language categories, however, If no projects within a category are deemed worthy of recognition, GLAAD may choose to not award the category that year. As of 2023, there are 33 competitive categories:

English-language

Spanish-language

Defunct categories
Outstanding Individual Episode (1998-2020)
Outstanding Daily Drama
Outstanding New York Theater – Broadway & Off-Broadway
Outstanding New York Theater – Off-Off Broadway
Outstanding Los Angeles Theater

Special awards
In addition to the GLAAD Media Awards' competitive categories, special non-competitive "Honorary Awards" have also been presented since the first Awards ceremony.  Beginning with just one Honorary Award, then known as the "Special Honoree Award" presented at the first annual GLAAD Media Awards, the Honorary Awards have also been expanded to recognize the diversity of contributions of respective Honorees. The most notable of these Special Honorary Awards are:
Ally Award
Presented twice at the GLAAD Media Awards in New York to Brett Ratner & Mariah Carey. It is presented to a media figure who has consistently used their platform to support and advance LGBT equality and acceptance.
Advocate for Change Award
Presented at the Los Angeles GLAAD Media Awards in 2013.  Its inaugural recipient was former U.S. President Bill Clinton for his record of promoting tolerance, including advocating same-sex marriage and calling for the Supreme Court of the United States to strike down the Defense of Marriage Act. The award was presented to Madonna in 2019.
Davidson/Valentini Award
Presented annually at the San Francisco GLAAD Media Awards. It is named in memory of Craig Davidson, GLAAD's first executive director, and his partner Michael Valentini, a GLAAD supporter. It is presented to an openly LGBT individual who has made a significant difference in promoting equal rights for the LGBT community.
Excellence in Media Award
Presented annually at the New York GLAAD Media Awards. It is presented to individuals in the media and entertainment industries who through their work have increased the visibility and understanding of the LGBT community.
Golden Gate Award
Presented annually at the San Francisco GLAAD Media Awards. It is presented to media professionals who have increased the visibility and understanding of the LGBT community.
Pioneer Award
Presented at the GLAAD Media Awards.  It is presented to a pioneering individual, group or outlet that has made a significant contribution to the development of LGBT-inclusive media images prior to the existence of the GLAAD Media Awards.
Stephen F. Kolzak Award
Presented annually at the GLAAD Media Awards. It is named after Stephen Kolzak, the Los Angeles casting director who devoted the last part of his life to fighting AIDS-phobia and homophobia in the entertainment industry. The award is given to an openly LGBT member of the entertainment or media community for his or her work toward eliminating homophobia.
Vanguard Award
Presented annually at the Los Angeles GLAAD Media Awards.  It is presented to a member of the entertainment community who has made a significant difference in promoting equal rights for LGBT people.
Visibilidad Award
Presented at the GLAAD Media Awards.  It is presented to an openly LGBT Spanish-language media professional who has made a significant difference in promoting equal rights for the LGBT community.
Vito Russo Award
Presented annually at the GLAAD Media Awards.  It is named in memory of Vito Russo, a founding member of GLAAD, and presented to an openly LGBT media professional who has made a significant difference in promoting equality for the LGBT community.

Ceremony

Award recipients are announced at the annual GLAAD Media Awards banquet ceremonies usually held in New York, Los Angeles, and San Francisco to honor achievements from January 1 to December 31 of the previous calendar year.  Over the years, ceremonies have also been held in Washington, D.C. and Miami. Each year's hosts and presenters are usually selected from former Honorees, celebrities and/or prominent public figures known for their contributions to the LGBT community.

The announcement of award recipients in all competitive categories is withheld until the ceremonies.  Although presented annually in three cities, time constraints dictate that not all of the awards are presented onstage.  Categories presented onstage in their respective cities are chosen to reflect the range of GLAAD's work with the media, representing a mix of entertainment, news, and Spanish-language awards.  Recipients who are not announced onstage are instead announced by a listing in the ceremony's program book.

The 16th Annual Awards held in 2005 were the first year that the ceremonies were televised, first airing on the Logo channel on July 24, 2005.  Logo continued to air the telecast annually, editing together each city's respective ceremonies for each year into one annual show, as well as airing a retrospective special in 2005 titled "The Best of the GLAAD Media Awards" which documented the history of the first 15 years of the Awards.  Logo ceased to televise the ceremony in 2008 when the Bravo network acquired exclusive broadcast rights to air the 19th Annual Awards telecast.

See also

 List of American television awards

Notes

References

External links

 
 GLAAD Media Awards on YouTube
 GLAAD Media Awards at IMDb
 GLAAD Media Awards at Life

 
Awards established in 1990
American film awards
American music awards
American television awards
American theater awards
American journalism awards
Comics awards
Spanish awards
LGBT portrayals in mass media
Zinc sculptures
1990 establishments in the United States